Clinton Chapel African Methodist Episcopal Zion Church (also known as Clinton Chapel AME Zion Church) is a historic African Methodist Episcopal church located at Union, South Carolina.

History 

Clinton Chapel was built in 1893 and expanded in 1948 during a period of growth for the African Methodist Episcopal Zion Church and the consolidation of Jim Crow segregation.

Added to the National Register of Historic Places on March 12, 2020.

References 

Baptist churches in South Carolina
Churches on the National Register of Historic Places in South Carolina
Gothic Revival church buildings in South Carolina
Churches in Union County, South Carolina
African-American history of South Carolina
National Register of Historic Places in Union County, South Carolina
African Methodist Episcopal Zion churches
1893 establishments in South Carolina
Churches completed in 1893